The quailfinch (Ortygospiza atricollis) is a species  of the estrildid finch. It is found in open grasslands in Africa. They are gregarious seed-eaters with short, thick, red bills. They are very terrestrial, with lark-like feet and claws.

Systematics
Previously, three species were recognized, but are now considered subspecies:
 Black-chinned quailfinch, Ortygospiza atricollis gabonensis
 African quailfinch, Ortygospiza atricollis fuscocrissa
 Black-faced quailfinch, Ortygospiza atricollis atricollis

The locust finch, Paludipasser locustella, is considered a member of this genus by some taxonomists.

Two issues are contentious: First, whether the locustfinch should be included here or given its own monotypic genus. Second, the "African quailfinch" complex might comprise one or three (sub)species. The two-taxon arrangement as found in most field guides and used by the IUCN, was recently shown to be based only on a single character (the color of the chin and throat). It is certainly erroneous, being contradicted by all other morphological, behavioral and DNA sequence data.

The molecular data would support a two-taxon arrangement with the taxa atricollis and fuscocrissa, but this is not supported by the other data. In conclusion, either gabonensis should be merged back into atricollis, or fuscocrissa should be restored to (sub)species status. Gene flow in the "African quailfinch" complex is still ongoing, and the three lineages therein either form a superspecies, or can be considered a single, wide-ranging and very variable species.

References

 Clement, Peter; Harris, Alan & Davis, John (1993): Finches and Sparrows: an identification guide. Christopher Helm, London. 
 Payne, Robert B. & Sorenson, Michael D. (2007): Integrative systematics at the species level: plumage, songs and molecular phylogeny of quailfinches Ortygospiza. Bull. B.O.C. 127(1): 4-26. PDF fulltext

Ortygospiza
Birds described in 1817
Taxa named by Louis Jean Pierre Vieillot